Soul Machine is a 1995 album by The Denison/Kimball Trio,

Music
Soul Machine (musician) Jérémie Palmigiani, French electronic music producer
Cee-Lo Green... Is the Soul Machine album by Cee Lo Green 2004
Soul Machine, album by Hungarian band The Trousers (band)
Soul Machine, sole album of Richard Barbary produced by Creed Taylor 1968 
"Soul Machine", song by Black Stone Cherry from Kentucky (album) 2016
"Soul Machine", The Salsoul Invention Late Night Tales Presents After Dark: Nightshift
"Soul Machine", vintage rarities and non-album B-sides by the funk group The Meters Zony Mash

Other 
Soul Machine: The Invention of the Modern Mind George Makari